The Bachelor: Rome is the ninth season of ABC reality television series The Bachelor. The show was filmed in Rome, Italy. The season premiered on October 3, 2006.

The show featured 34-year-old Prince Lorenzo Borghese, an Italian American cosmetics entrepreneur, courting 25 women. The season concluded on November 27, 2006, with Borghese choosing to pursue a relationship with 24-year-old teacher Jennifer Wilson. The couple ended their relationship shortly after the finale aired.

Contestants
Traditionally the Bachelor chooses from an original cast of 25 bachelorettes, however this season show producers brought in two additional ladies who are local Italians bringing the total women to 27.

The following is the list of bachelorettes for this season:

Future appearances

Bachelor Pad
Erica Rose returned to compete in the second season of Bachelor Pad where she and her partner, Blake Julian, were eliminated in week 5. She returned in the third season of Bachelor Pad the following year and once again was eliminated in week 5.

Elimination Chart

 The contestant won the competition.
 The contestant was eliminated at the rose ceremony.

Episodes

The winner
Jennifer Wilson was the eventual winner of "The Bachelor: Rome". As of the end of the show, Jennifer was a Glades Middle School teacher from Pembroke Pines. Jennifer graduated from Dade Christian School and the University of Michigan with a bachelor's degree in general studies.

After the show
Jennifer Wilson and Lorenzo Borghese broke up after a long-distance relationship where he was in New York while she was in South Florida. Lorenzo did not propose to Jennifer, but gave her the final rose. Jennifer Wilson was accused of secretly dating Dan Herrero, another teacher at the school she worked at, by The National Enquirer soon after the end of the show. The Enquirer included pictures of them "frolicking on the beach" together three days after the initial report. Lorenzo Borghese later began dating runner-up Sadie Murray. Erica Rose later appeared on season one of VH1's "You're Cut Off" and seasons 2 and 3 of Bachelor Pad.

References

External links
ABC Official Site of The Bachelor: Rome

The Bachelor (American TV series) seasons
2006 American television seasons
Television shows filmed in Italy
Television shows filmed in California
Television shows filmed in Oregon
Television shows filmed in Miami
Television shows filmed in Sweden
Television shows filmed in Hungary